Captains Courageous is a 1937 Metro-Goldwyn-Mayer adventure film. Based on the 1897 novel of the same name by Rudyard Kipling, the film had its world premiere at the Carthay Circle Theatre in Los Angeles. It was produced by Louis D. Lighton and directed by Victor Fleming. Filmed in black and white, Captains Courageous was advertised by MGM as a coming-of-age classic with exciting action sequences.

Backgrounds and exteriors for the film, which updated the story's setting to the mid-1920s, were shot on location in Port aux Basques, Newfoundland and Shelburne, Nova Scotia in Canada, and Gloucester, Massachusetts in the United States.

Plot
Harvey Cheyne (Freddie Bartholomew) is the spoiled son of American business tycoon Frank Burton Cheyne (Melvyn Douglas). Harvey is shunned by his classmates at a private boarding school, and eventually suspended for bad behavior. His father therefore takes him on a business trip to Europe, travelling there by trans-Atlantic steamship. Mid-passage, Harvey falls overboard in the Grand Banks of Newfoundland. He is rescued by a Portuguese-American fisherman, Manuel Fidello (Spencer Tracy), and taken aboard the fishing schooner "We're Here", from Gloucester, Massachusetts.

Harvey is shocked the schooner's captain, Disko Troop (Lionel Barrymore), intends fishing in the Atlantic for three more months. He fails to persuade the captain to take him back to New York nor can he convince him of his wealth; but Captain Troop offers Harvey temporary crew membership until they return to port. Harvey is reluctant to do real work but eventually accepts. Befriended by Captain Troop's son, Dan (Mickey Rooney), he becomes acclimated to the demanding fishing lifestyle. The We're Here fills with fish they catch. When a prank of Harvey's causes a fish hook to lodge in a crewman's arm ("Long Jack", played by John Carradine), Manuel defends the boy.

In the climactic race back to the Gloucester, Massachusetts port against a rival schooner, the Jennie Cushman, Manuel climbs to the top of the mast to furl the sail. However, the mast cracks and he is plunged into the icy sea, tangled in the rigging that will cut him in half. Manuel speaks to the cook in Portuguese and the cook tells the Captain: All the bottom half of him is gone, and he doesn't want the boy to see. He tells the captain to cut him free from the boat, knowing this will kill him. Harvey crawls out on the wreckage, crying and distraught, while the captain strikes blow after blow after blow with the ax until the rigging finally parts. Manuel kisses the cross around his neck and sinks below the water. The schooner returns to port and Harvey is reunited with his father, who is impressed by his son's maturity. Harvey grieves for Manuel, pushing his father away and wanting to stay on the We're Here, but Disko reassures Cheyne, telling him that there is room in Harvey's heart for both men and that once there he “will find Manuel mighty satisfactory company.” At the church, Harvey lights two candles, one from Manuel to his father and one from him to Manuel. His father overhears Harvey praying that someday he will be with Manuel again and follows the boy to Manuel's dory, floating near the ship. Harvey is inconsolable and begs Cheyne to leave him alone.

The next day, in front of the Fisherman's Memorial, he and his father join the Gloucester community in casting bouquets and wreaths on the outgoing tide in tribute to the men and boys lost during this fishing season. The last shot shows the Cheyne's car, speeding down the road with Manuel's dory on a trailer behind. Through the side window, we see that Harvey is laughing and gesturing, regaling his father with stories of his adventures. Dissolve to a close-up of a smiling Manuel and then to the Fisherman's Memorial.

Cast
 Freddie Bartholomew as Harvey Cheyne
 Spencer Tracy as Manuel Fidello
 Lionel Barrymore as Captain Disko Troop
 Melvyn Douglas as Frank Burton Cheyne
 Charley Grapewin as Uncle Salters
 Mickey Rooney as Dan Troop
 John Carradine as "Long Jack"
 Oscar O'Shea as Captain Walt Cushman
 Jack La Rue as Priest (credited as Jack LaRue)
 Walter Kingsford as Dr. Finley
 Donald Briggs as Bob Tyler
 Sam McDaniel as "Doc" (credited as Sam McDaniels)
 Bill Burrud as Charles Jamison (credited as Billy Burrud)
 Gladden James as Secretary Cobb (uncredited)
 Frank Sully as taxi driver (uncredited)
 Billy Gilbert as soda steward (uncredited)
 Charles Coleman as Burns, the butler (uncredited)
 Lester Dorr as corridor steward (uncredited)

Reception

Frank S. Nugent of The New York Times called the film "another of those grand jobs of movie-making we have come to expect of Hollywood's most prodigal studio. With its rich production, magnificent marine photography, admirable direction and performances, the film brings vividly to life every page of Kipling's novel and even adds an exciting chapter or two of its own." Variety reported that the Kipling story had "been given splendid production, performance, photography and dramatic composition." Harrison's Reports wrote, "Excellent! It is the type of entertainment that audiences will not forget soon, for its spiritual beauty makes a deep impression on one." John Mosher of The New Yorker called it "as rich a film as you will see this spring ... The picture is magnificent as a sketch of storm and struggle on the ocean."

Box office
According to MGM records the film earned $1,688,000 in the US and Canada and $1,445,000 elsewhere resulting in a profit of $355,000.

Awards
Spencer Tracy won the Academy Award for Best Actor for his work in this film.  The movie was also nominated for three other Academy Awards:
 Best Picture – Louis D. Lighton, producer
 Best Film Editing – Elmo Veron
 Best Writing, Screenplay – Marc Connelly, John Lee Mahin and Dale Van Every

A VHS edition of the 1937 film was released by MGM Home Video in 1990 followed by Warner Home Video's DVD of the film on January 31, 2006.

The film is recognized by American Film Institute in these lists:
 2003: AFI's 100 Years...100 Heroes & Villains:
 Manuel Fidello – Nominated Hero
 2006: AFI's 100 Years...100 Cheers – #94

In popular culture
Holden Caulfield, protagonist of the 1951 novel The Catcher in the Rye, is thought to look like Harvey Cheyne, as in the book a prostitute tells Caulfield that he looks like the boy who falls off a boat in a film costarring Melvyn Douglas, though the film is not mentioned by name.

The film is considered a classic semi-documentary record of Grand Banks Schooners fishing under sail. The back projection shots of the period fishing schooners under sail are frequently watched by members of the American Sail Training Community for the sailing shots - rather than for the human plot.

Chris Elliott has stated that Captains Courageous was the inspiration for the film Cabin Boy.

See also
 Lionel Barrymore filmography
 Spencer Tracy filmography

References

External links 
 
 
 
 
 

1937 films
1930s adventure drama films
American adventure drama films
American black-and-white films
Films scored by Franz Waxman
Films about fishing
Films based on British novels
Films based on works by Rudyard Kipling
Films directed by Victor Fleming
Films featuring a Best Actor Academy Award-winning performance
Films set in Massachusetts
Films set on ships
Metro-Goldwyn-Mayer films
Sea adventure films
Seafaring films
Films set in the Atlantic Ocean
1937 drama films
Photoplay Awards film of the year winners
1930s English-language films
1930s American films